Ilterish Qaghan (Xiédiēlìshīkěhàn; personal name: Ashina Qutlugh, 阿史那骨篤祿/阿史那骨笃禄, āshǐnà gǔdǔlù, a-shih-na ku-tu-lu, d. 692) was the founder of the Second Turkic Khaganate (reigning 682–692).

He was a chieftain of Tujue in 650 inside Chanyu territory (near modern Tsetserleg, Mongolia). His father and grandfather served as tuduns.

Reign 
After the defeat of Ashina Funian, Ilterish left for the Mongolian steppe, where he raised an army of 17 generals and 5,000 men. He started with an attack on Huige in 681. He reconquered most of the lands of the first Eastern Turkic Khaganate, founding the Second Turkic Khaganate. In 682 Xue Rengui was commissioned to attack Ashide Yuanzhen, now an aide of Ilterish. His presence intimidated Tujue soldiers, who had thought that he was long dead, and he scored a major victory over Ashide Yuanzhen.

Nevertheless, in 683, the qaghan attacked Wei Prefecture (蔚州, roughly modern Datong, Shanxi) and killed its prefect, Li Sijian (李思儉). When Tang Xiujing's superior, Cui Zhibian (崔智辯) the commandant at Feng Prefecture, tried to intercept the qaghan at Mount Zhaona (朝那山, in modern Baotou, Inner Mongolia), he was defeated and captured. In response, Emperor Gaozong considered withdrawing from Feng Prefecture and moving its residents to Ling (靈州, roughly modern Yinchuan, Ningxia) and Xia (夏州, roughly modern Yulin) Prefectures.

By 683, Wang Benli was serving as the commandant at Sheng Prefecture (勝州, in modern Hohhot, Inner Mongolia). Khagan attacked the nearby Chanyu Protector General headquarters (單于總督府, also in modern Hohhot), capturing and killing the official Zhang Xingshi (張行師). Emperor Gaozong sent Wang, along with Li Chongyi (李崇義), the commandant at Xia Prefecture (夏州, roughly modern Yulin, Shaanxi), to defend against attack by Tujue, but historical accounts do not indicate what the results were.

In 687, another invasion of Tang by khagan and Ashide Yuanzhen (阿史德元珍) began. Empress Dowager Wu commissioned the ethnically Baekje general Heichi Changzhi, assisted by Li Duozuo, to defend against Tujue attack and they were able to defeat Tujue forces at Huanghuadui (黃花堆, in modern Shuozhou, Shanxi), causing Tujue forces to flee.

In general, during his reign raids were frequent, reaching almost 40 invasions by Tujue. 20 of these were personally commanded by khagan himself. He appointed brothers Ashina Mochuo and Ashina Duoxifu as shads and yabgus. He was succeeded by his brother, Qapaghan Qaghan, because his son Bilge was too young.

Family
Ilterish Qaghan was the head of the Ashina and distantly related to the Khagans of the first Göktürk Khaganate. His brothers were Ashina Mochuo and Ashina Duoxifu.

Qaghatun
El Bilga Khatun
Children
Bilge Qaghan
Kul Tegin
Toŋa Tegin

Kultegin's memorial complex
Ilterish is mentioned also in 10 to 12 lines of the Kultegin inscription as follows:

...Then Turk Tengri above, Turkish holy Earth and Water said as follows: "In order to Turkish people would not go to ruin and in order to should be a nation again", They rose my father Ilterish Kagan and my mother Ilbilga Katun, to the top and sat them upwards on the throne. My father, the kagan gathered together seventeen brave Lords... Tengri gave them power. My father's army was like wolves, their enemies were like sheep..."

Legacy
Kutlu, Kutluk, İlter and İlteriş are common masculine Turkish given names, which are used in memory of Ilterish Qaghan. Mihaly Dobrovits believes he changed lateral system of succession to primogeniture, thus trying to avoid fate of the First Turkic Khaganate.

On 23 August 2022, his memorial complex and an inscription written in Turkic and Sogdian was found at Khangai Mountains, in Mongolia's Otuken region.

References

Sources

External links
 Göktürks (Blue Turks) Kingdoms of Central Asia

7th-century births
694 deaths
Göktürk khagans
Ashina house of the Turkic Empire
7th-century Turkic people
Founding monarchs
Tengrist monarchs